Brier Hill is a neighborhood in Youngstown, Ohio, U.S.

Brier Hill may also refer to:

Brier Hill, Pennsylvania, an unincorporated community
Brier Hill (Brier Hill, Pennsylvania), a national historic district 
Brier Hill, Ontario, Leeds and the Thousand Islands

See also
 Brier (disambiguation), also Briar
 Briar Hill (disambiguation)